Kyle Connell (born 2 August 2001) is a Scottish professional footballer who plays as a forward for East Kilbride. He has also played for Kilmarnock, and on loan for Airdrieonians, East Fife and Raith Rovers.

Club career

Blackburn Rovers 
Connell began his career at Motherwell before joining the youth team at Blackburn Rovers during the summer of 2017 for an undisclosed fee.

Kilmarnock 
After leaving Blackburn, Connell returned to Scotland and joined the youth set-up at Kilmarnock, making his debut as a second-half substitute in a 6−0 win over Queen's Park in the Scottish Cup.

On 5 October 2020, Connell joined Scottish League One side Airdrieonians on an initial short−term loan until January, which was later extended until the end of the season.

East Kilbride 
On 26 January 2023, Connell joined Lowland League club East Kilbride.

References

2001 births
Living people
Scottish footballers
Kilmarnock F.C. players
Scottish Professional Football League players
Association football forwards
Airdrieonians F.C. players
East Fife F.C. players
Raith Rovers F.C. players

Lowland Football League players
East Kilbride F.C. players